Cross-country skiing at the 2003 Asian Winter Games was held at the Ajara Athletic Park in Ōwani, Japan from 2 February to 7 February 2003.

Schedule

Medalists

Men

Women

Medal table

Participating nations
A total of 51 athletes from 9 nations competed in cross-country skiing at the 2003 Asian Winter Games:

References
Results of the Fifth Winter Asian Games
2003 Results

 
2003 Asian Winter Games events
2003
Asian Winter Games